Latha Mangipudi is a New Hampshire politician.

Education
Mangipudi graduated from Boston University and from the All India Institute of Speech and Hearing.

Career
On November 5, 2013, Mangipudi was elected to the New Hampshire House of Representatives where she represents the Hillsborough 35 district. Mangipudi assumed office on November 13, 2013. Mangipudi is a Democrat.

Personal life
Mangipudi resides in Nashua, New Hampshire. Mangipudi is married and has two children.

References

Living people
Women state legislators in New Hampshire
Boston University alumni
Politicians from Nashua, New Hampshire
Democratic Party members of the New Hampshire House of Representatives
21st-century American women politicians
21st-century American politicians
Year of birth missing (living people)